The Flores giant rat (Papagomys armandvillei) is a rodent of the family Muridae that occurs on the island of Flores in Indonesia. It has been recorded in Rutong Protection Forest. The species is found in primary, secondary and disturbed forest over a wide range of elevations. These dimensions are about twice as large as those of a typical brown rat (Rattus norvegicus), which suggests about eight times the body mass. 

Papagomys armandvillei is the only extant species in the genus Papagomys. The specific epithet, armandvillei, honours the Dutch Jesuit missionary Cornelis J. F. le Cocq d'Armandville (1846-1896) who was stationed in the Dutch East Indies, and later in New Guinea.

Guy Musser describes the Flores giant rat as having small, round ears, a chunky body, and a small tail, and as appearing to be adapted for life on the ground with refuge in burrows. It has dense dark hair (pelage). Analysis of the teeth suggests a diet of leaves, buds, fruit, and certain kinds of insects as inferred by large hypsodont teeth.

Conservation
P. armandvillei is listed as Near Threatened by the IUCN Red List. Threats include subsistence hunting and predation by dogs and cats. A related species, P. theodorverhoeveni, is known from subfossil remains from 3,000 – 4,000 years ago. This species is presumed to be extinct, but may still exist on the island.

See also
 Island gigantism

References

External links

Papagomys
Rodents of Indonesia
Rodents of Flores
Mammals described in 1892